Ave Line is a Latvian shipping company that operates between Lübeck-Travemünde and Riga.

History 

Ave Line was founded in 2000 and launched their first ferry service between Travemünde and Liepāja on November 21, 2008.

Ave Line initially only operated with the chartered Ave Liepaja (former Brave Merchant), at the end of 2008 a second ship, the Ave Luebeck (formerly Dawn Merchant), was chartered. But before the Ave Luebeck had reached the Baltic Sea, the charter was canceled. After the charter of the Ave Liepaja expired at the end of 2009, the service was out for about four months. In April 2010 Ave Line presented the Baltic Amber (formerly Borja) as the successor for the Ave Liepaja. After Scandlines took over the route from Travemünde to Liepaja, Ave Line went to the Latvian port of Ventspils before the service was moved to Riga.

Ferries

Ave Liepaja (2008–2009) 

Built 1999 as Brave Merchant, for Merchant Ferries, in Seville, Spain. From 2006 to 2008 chartered for use between Palma, Majorca and Barcelona by Iscomar and renamed Blanca del Mar. In November 2008, chartered by Ave Line and renamed Ave Liepaja for service between Travemünde and Liepaja. Since March 2010 it is on duty for LD Lines between Boulogne-sur-Mer and Dover, and was renamed the Norman Bridge.

Ave Luebeck (2008–2009) 

Built in 1998 as a sister ship of the Ave Liepaja as Dawn Merchant. First renamed in 2005 in Europax Appia, before it was chartered in 2006 by Baleària and renamed Pau Casals to run between Valencia, Spain and Palma, Majorca. Since April 2009 the by then renamed ship T-Rex operates between Genoa and Termini Imerese for T-Link Lines.

Baltic Amber (since 2010) 

The Baltic Amber was built in 2007 for Balearia as Borja in Porto Viro, Italy. It operated on the route Barcelona - Palma. In March 2010 it was chartered by Ave Line and renamed Baltic Amber.

References 

Ferry companies of Latvia
Companies based in Riga